Diana Fessler is a former Republican member of the Ohio House of Representatives, who represented the 79th District from 2001 to 2008 and lived in New Carlisle.

References

External links
Page on the Ohio House of Representatives website
Profile on the Ohio Ladies Gallery website

Republican Party members of the Ohio House of Representatives
Women state legislators in Ohio
Living people
21st-century American politicians
21st-century American women politicians
Year of birth missing (living people)
People from New Carlisle, Ohio